Shyam Sunder Vyas (1922 - 2009) was a freedom fighter, journalist, and philanthropist hailing from the town of Jodhpur, Rajasthan. Vyas, affectionately known as "Gudiya Saab", was a prominent figure of the Pushkarna Brahmin community in Rajasthan.

Early life
He was born in July 1922 in a Brahmin family to shri Askaran ji Vyas in Jodhpur. He completed his M.A.LLB from the now Jai Narayan Vyas University. He was

Activist career
In 1942, Jai Narayan Vyas started a movement after consultation with Mahatma Gandhi, Jawaharlal Nehru and Sardar Patel in which public elected should dominate in all princely states of India. As a result of which Jai Narayan with Mathuradas Mathur was jailed. This news triggered Shyam Sunder Vyas and his colleagues Ramchandra Boda, Kirori Mal Mehta, Ugmraj Muhnot etc. to continue the movement. The movement gained momentum and popularity which caught the attention of the British ruler. As a result of this, Shyam Sunder Vyas was jailed. Prior to this, Shyam Sunder Vyas was an active member of the local meetings that were held under the leadership of Jai Narayan Vyas. Shyam Sunder Vyas was assigned the role of informer while the exchange of information and news was next to impossible under British Regime.

Honors

References

http://daily.bhaskar.com/news/jharkhand-cj-on-city-visit-1391846.html
http://freedomfightersantladaram.org/index.php/role-in-the-freedom-struggle.html

Indian revolutionaries
People from Jodhpur
1922 births
2009 deaths